James Robinson Clitheroe (24 December 1921 – 6 June 1973) was an English comic entertainer. He is best remembered for his long-running BBC Radio programme, The Clitheroe Kid (1956–72).

Early years
Jimmy Clitheroe was born in Clitheroe, Lancashire, England on Christmas Eve, 1921 to weavers Emma Pye and James Robert Clitheroe, who had married in 1918. His place of birth was his maternal grandparents' home at 58 Wilkin Street (now called Highfield Road). His childhood was spent in the mill village of Blacko, near Nelson, living at 14 Spout Houses, a row of terraced houses below Blacko Tower. He attended the Council School up to the age of 12, when he transferred to Barrowford Board School for his final two years, in an era when education was compulsory only up to the age of 14.

An only child, he was named after his mother's younger brother, James Robinson Pye, who had been born in Clitheroe in 1894 and was killed in action in the First World War.

His small size was thought to be caused by his thyroid gland being damaged at birth during a forceps delivery. According to Robert Ross however, Jimmy's small size was due to a rare genetic disorder. and until later life, he could easily pass for an 11-year-old, which was the character he played on stage, in his early films, and on radio and television.

Career
Being unable to work in the weaving sheds with his parents, as he was too short to reach the looms, Clitheroe worked for a time in a bakery in Nelson, but was also touring the variety theatres in Yorkshire and Lancashire from 1937 as a boy accordionist, and also played the xylophone and saxophone. Later, he bought a caravan to live in whilst touring the various towns in whose theatres he appeared. He made his first pantomime appearance in 1938, alongside the bumptious "Two Ton" Tessie O'Shea. In pantomime he was usually cast as Buttons, Tom Thumb, or Wishee Washee. He moved into films from 1940 (thanks to a chance meeting with top of the bill stars Arthur Lucan and Kitty McShane) and radio from 1954 (initially on the BBC's regional Home Service North, and subsequently on the nationwide BBC Light Programme, then television (with ITV, produced by ABC Television in their Manchester studios) from 1963.

During the 1940s, Clitheroe appeared in pantomime and summer season dates, and in films, with stars of the day including Arthur Lucan (as Old Mother Riley), George Formby, Vera Lynn, and Frank Randle. In 1959, Clitheroe was invited to take part in the Royal Command variety show, in the presence of the Queen Mother.

His long-running radio programme on the BBC, The Clitheroe Kid, was broadcast from 1956 until August 1972. His catchphrase was "Don't some mothers 'ave 'em!" Two versions of the radio series were produced for television on the ITV network: That's My Boy! (which ran for seven episodes in 1963), and Just Jimmy (which ran for 5 years, between 1964 and 1968). Mollie Sugden, who had worked with Clitheroe in his stage shows, played his mother in the latter series.
 
Clitheroe owned a bookmaker's shop on Springfield Road, Blackpool, and the Fernhill Hotel at Preesall. He appeared on the Blackpool stage from 1936 until 1971. In September 1972 The Clitheroe Kid was cancelled by the BBC after a 16-year run.

Personal life
From 1960 onwards, Clitheroe lived in a bungalow, 118 Bispham Road in Blackpool with his mother, to whom he was devoted. His father had died on 9 January 1951, from complications arising from injuries sustained in the First World War. Jimmy was godfather to co-star Diana Day's daughter. She named her son James after him. Clitheroe himself never married.

For many years he drove a Mercedes car, with blocks on the pedals, adapted by mechanic Michael Darbyshire so that his feet could reach them. Appearing to be an underage driver, he could seldom complete a journey without attracting the attention of the police.

Illness and death
On 30 March, 1973, Clitheroe collapsed in his hotel room in Plymouth, while touring in a variety show, and spent four days in hospital.

Jimmy Clitheroe died on 6 June, 1973 from an accidental overdose of sleeping pills, combined with seven brandies, on the day of his mother's funeral. He was found unconscious in bed by relatives, and died later that day in hospital in Blackpool. His mother had died five days before, aged 84. His funeral was held at Carleton Crematorium, Blackpool, on 11 June 1973, where for many years he was commemorated by a plaque attached to memorial tree Number 3. Over 300 people attended.

Filmography
 Old Mother Riley in Society (1940) with Lucan and McShane – as Boots
 Much Too Shy (1942) with George Formby – as Jimmy
 Rhythm Serenade (1943) with Dame Vera Lynn – as Joey
 Somewhere in Politics (1948) with Frank Randle – as Sonny
 School for Randle (1949) with Frank Randle – as Jimmy
 Stars in Your Eyes (1956) with Nat Jackley – as Joey
 Jules Verne's Rocket to the Moon (1967) with Burl Ives – as General Tom Thumb

References

External links
 
 Jimmy Clitheroe in the BBC Genome
 'The Clitheroe Kid' in the BBC Genome
 Stephen Poppitt's Jimmy Clitheroe website (founded in 2001), originally at JimmyClitheroe.co.uk
 Jimmy Clitheroe website (archived version) (2012)
 Jimmy Clitheroe's ITV television shows at Uncle Earl's Classic TV Channel

1921 births
1973 deaths
Drug-related deaths in England
Accidental deaths in England
20th-century English comedians
English male comedians
Music hall performers
People from Clitheroe